James J. Nash (1875-June 11, 1927) was a soldier serving in the United States Army during the Spanish–American War who received the Medal of Honor for bravery.

Biography
Nash was born 1875 in Louisville, Kentucky and entered the army from same location. He was sent to the Spanish–American War with Company F, 10th U.S. Infantry as a private where he received the Medal of Honor for assisting in the rescue of wounded while under heavy enemy fire.

He died June 11, 1927, and is buried in San Antonio National Cemetery San Antonio, Texas. His grave can be found in section I, grave 1461-A at GPS (lat/lon): 29.25279, -98.28078.

Medal of Honor citation
Rank and organization: Private, Company F, 10th U.S. Infantry. Place and date: At Santiago, Cuba, 1 July 1898. Entered service at: Louisville, Ky. Birth: Louisville, Ky. Date of issue: 22 June 1899.

Citation
Gallantly assisted in the rescue of the wounded from in front of the lines and under heavy fire from the enemy.

See also

List of Medal of Honor recipients for the Spanish–American War

References

External links

1875 births
1927 deaths
United States Army Medal of Honor recipients
United States Army soldiers
American military personnel of the Spanish–American War
Military personnel from Louisville, Kentucky
Burials in Texas
Spanish–American War recipients of the Medal of Honor